De Bunker  is a 1992 Dutch drama film directed by Gerard Soeteman.

Cast
Thom Hoffman	... 	Gerrit Kleinveld
Huub van der Lubbe	... 	Wolting
Dolf de Vries	... 	Ferguson
Geert Lageveen	... 	Schrander
Gijs de Lange	... 	Demani
Peter Bos	... 	Dekker
Cas Enklaar	... 	Van Zalingen
Ids van der Krieken	... 	Van der Groep
Fred Goessens	... 	Freekenhorst
Jaap Maarleveld	... 	Van der Stam
Jack Wouterse	... 	Ritter
Kees Campfens	... 	Franzka
Rik van Uffelen	... 	Noppen
Han Kerkhoffs	... 	Flipse
Boris Gerrets	... 	Horak

External links 
 

1992 films
1990s Dutch-language films
1992 drama films
Dutch drama films